Roberto Luís Gaspar de Deus Severo  (born 3 May 1976), known as Beto, is a Portuguese former professional footballer who played mainly as a central defender.

He played most of his professional career with Sporting CP (ten seasons, more than 300 official games and five major titles), but also had spells in France and Spain, which included spending three years with Recreativo de Huelva.

Beto represented the Portugal national team at the 2002 World Cup and two European Championships, winning 31 caps.

Club career

Sporting CP
A product of Primeira Liga club Sporting CP, Lisbon-born Beto established himself in the first team in the 1996–97 season at the age of just 20, after two loans. As a defensive force and captain he scored some important goals, including against FC Porto, but also two own goals in a single match against rivals S.L. Benfica, a 1–2 home loss.

Beto won the national league twice, in 2000 and 2002, conquering the double the latter year. During his ten-year spell with the Lions, he managed to net at least once in every season.

Recreativo
After falling out with Sporting coach Paulo Bento in January 2006, Beto signed for Ligue 1 club FC Girondins de Bordeaux for €1 million, but appeared sparingly for the French during his five-month stay. On the last day of the summer transfer window of the same year, he was sent on loan to La Liga returnee Recreativo de Huelva.

On 1 July 2007, Beto signed a three-year permanent deal with the Andalusia club. After two solid first campaigns (netting twice in each, and partnering compatriots Carlos Martins and Silvestre Varela in 2007–08), he only played three matches in his last due to recurrent physical problems, as Recreativo eventually ranked last.

Retirement
After terminating his contract with Recreativo, 33-year-old Beto signed for one year with C.F. Os Belenenses, in August 2009. As in latest years, his first season was blighted by constant injuries, and the capital side was also relegated.

In late January 2011, aged almost 35, Beto returned to Spain and signed a short-term deal with UD Alzira in the third division. He reunited at the club with former Sporting teammate Luís Lourenço, and both were released in June after the team's relegation, having appeared in a combined total of three games.

Beto returned to main club Sporting in August 2011, being appointed external public relations director and quitting his post two years later.

International career
Beto made his Portugal debut on 6 September 1997, in a 1–1 draw against Germany for the 1998 FIFA World Cup qualifiers in Berlin. He was subsequently part of the nation's squads at the 2002 World Cup – where he scored against the United States, as the national team lost 3–2 and exited in the group stage (he played that competition as a right-back)– and both the 2000 and 2004 UEFA European Championships.

Career statistics
Scores and results list Portugal's goal tally first, score column indicates score after each Beto goal.

|}

Honours
Sporting CP
Primeira Liga: 1999–2000, 2001–02
Taça de Portugal: 2001–02
Supertaça Cândido de Oliveira: 2000, 2002
UEFA Cup runner-up: 2004–05

Portugal
UEFA European Championship runner-up: 2004

Orders
 Medal of Merit, Order of the Immaculate Conception of Vila Viçosa (House of Braganza)

References

External links

1976 births
Living people
Portuguese footballers
Footballers from Lisbon
Association football defenders
Primeira Liga players
Liga Portugal 2 players
Sporting CP footballers
C.F. União de Lamas players
S.C. Campomaiorense players
C.F. Os Belenenses players
Ligue 1 players
FC Girondins de Bordeaux players
La Liga players
Recreativo de Huelva players
UD Alzira footballers
Portugal youth international footballers
Portugal under-21 international footballers
Portugal international footballers
UEFA Euro 2000 players
2002 FIFA World Cup players
UEFA Euro 2004 players
Footballers at the 1996 Summer Olympics
Olympic footballers of Portugal
Portuguese expatriate footballers
Expatriate footballers in France
Expatriate footballers in Spain
Portuguese expatriate sportspeople in France
Portuguese expatriate sportspeople in Spain